Spencer Township is one of fifteen townships in DeKalb County, Indiana. As of the 2010 census, its population was 1,233 and it contained 452 housing units.

History
The Spencerville Covered Bridge was added to the National Register of Historic Places in 1981.

Geography

Unincorporated towns
 Spencerville

Adjacent townships
 Concord Township (north)
 Newville Township (east)
 Scipio Township, Allen County (southeast)
 Springfield Township, Allen County (south)
 Cedar Creek Township, Allen County (southwest)
 Jackson Township (west)

Major highways
  Indiana State Road 1
  Indiana State Road 101

Cemeteries
The township contains two cemeteries: Riverside and White City.

References
 United States Census Bureau cartographic boundary files
 U.S. Board on Geographic Names

External links

 Indiana Township Association
 United Township Association of Indiana

Townships in DeKalb County, Indiana
Townships in Indiana